Bishop Yulian Voronovskyi (also exist Romanization as Julian Voronovsky, ; 5 May 1936 in Humnyska, Second Polish Republic, now is Zolochiv Raion, Lviv Oblast, Ukraine – 28 February 2013 in Lviv) was the Eparchial bishop of Ukrainian Catholic Eparchy of Sambir-Drohobych from 30 March 1994 to 27 October 2011.

Biography
In 1958 he entered the clandestine Studite Brethren monastery. Working at a state job, he simultaneously studied in the underground seminary in Lviv. On 27 October 1968 he received priestly ordination at the hands of Archbishop Vasyl Velychkovsky. Than he was Hegumen (superior) of the Studite monastery.

On 30 September 1986 he received episcopal consecration at the hands of Archbishop Volodymyr Sterniuk. He was appointed Auxiliary bishop of the Ukrainian Catholic Archeparchy of Lviv. In 1990 he was elected the archimandrite of the Univ Holy Dormition Lavra of the Studite Rite and the Rector of Holy Spirit Seminary in Lviv.

On 20 July 1993 he was appointed the Administrator of the newly created Ukrainian Catholic Eparchy of Sambir-Drohobych, and from 1994-2011 was  its Eparch.

Voronovskyi died on 28 February 2013, after undergoing surgery without regaining consciousness in the intensive care department of the Lviv regional hospital.  He was 76.

References

1936 births
2013 deaths
People from Lviv Oblast
People from Lwów Voivodeship
Ukrainian Academy of Printing alumni
Ukrainian Eastern Catholics
Studite Brethren
Bishops of the Ukrainian Greek Catholic Church
Recipients of the Order of Merit (Ukraine), 3rd class
Recipients of the Order of Merit (Ukraine), 2nd class